Rocketts Landing station, located in the Rocketts Landing development, is the Richmond, Virginia bus station site of the GRTC Bus Rapid Transit route. It is the eastern terminus of the line.

References

External links
 Rocketts Landing station

Buildings and structures in Henrico County, Virginia
GRTC Pulse stations
2018 establishments in Virginia
Bus stations in Virginia
Transport infrastructure completed in 2018